The media of Bahrain mainly consists of several weekly and daily newspapers, with the Information Affairs Authority controlling Bahrain's state-owned Bahrain Radio and Television Corporation, which broadcasts radio and television services. The media is predominantly in Arabic though English language and Malayalam newspapers are beginning to emerge in the country. The IAA also controls the Bahrain News Agency which monitors, originates and relays national and international news in Arabic and English, usually generating from 90 to 150 stories a day. Bahrain Telecommunication Company, trading as Batelco, is Bahrain's sole Internet service provider. In 2015, there were an estimated 1.29 million internet user, a penetration of 96.4%.

Most of the press is privately owned and is not subject to censorship as long as it refrains from criticizing the ruling family. Al Wasat newspaper and the Bahrain Mirror are regarded as the country's opposition news sources.

Television

The country's television is state-owned and controlled by the Information Affairs Authority, which operates over five terrestrial TV networks. 

An opposition news station, LuaLua TV operates from London, though it is blocked in the country.

Radio

Like the country's television services, it is primarily state-run, under the Bahrain Radio and Television Corporation; services are usually in Arabic. Radio Bahrain is also in English. In addition, 'Your FM' is an Indian language radio station primarily serving listeners from the Indian sub continent.

Newspapers

The country's first newspaper was the Newspaper of Bahrain weekly newspaper which was first published in the 1940s. Another weekly newspaper, Sada al-Usbu''' (literally "Weekly echo"), came into publication in 1969. A third weekly newspaper, Al Mujtama al-Jadid came into publication in 1970. In 1971, when the country declared independence, there was a minimal presence of print media in the country. However in 1976, the country's first daily newspaper and arguably one of the  principal , Akhbar Al Khaleej was published in Arabic by the Akhbar al Khaleej Press company. In 1979, a sister English-language newspaper was started, called Gulf Daily News. In 1989, the Al Ayam was launched. These three newspapers are considered the principal papers of the country. By the 1990s, there were more than 45 publications in print, which also included company-sponsored newspapers like the Bahrain Petroleum Company's Akhbar'' paper.

Due to the huge malayali population in the Persian Gulf region four malayalam newspapers also have editions from Bahrain. Gulf Madhyamam started publication in Bahrain in 1999. Malayala Manorama and Chandrika are also published from Bahrain. Another malayalam newspaper Gulf Thejas was launched in Bahrain on 27 September 2012 by Akhbar Al Khaleej editor-in-chief Anwar Abdulrahman at a ceremony held in Manama.

A new generation internet media and news company LocalBH has gained significant popularity in Bahrain and has amassed a large following on social media. Its Instagram account  has grown to become a primary source of news, events, and activities for the English-speaking and expatriate community of Bahrain, leading the way in the country's digital news landscape. LocalBH also regularly sponsors major events in Bahrain including BraveCF, Manama Entrepreneurship Week, BITEX and others.

Below is a list of newspapers that currently operate in the country:

See also
Information Affairs Authority
Culture of Bahrain

References

Communications in Bahrain